José María Reyna Barrios (24 December 1854 – 8 February 1898) was President of Guatemala from 15 March 1892 until his death on 8 February 1898. He was born in San Marcos, Guatemala and was nicknamed Reynita, the diminutive form, because of his short stature.

He was a moderate of Guatemala's Liberal Party, who worked to solidify the less controversial of the reforms of late president Justo Rufino Barrios.

Political life 

Reyna Barrios was nephew of Justo Rufino Barrios, and as such he started his political career while his uncle was still President of Guatemala.  After Barrios sudden death in Chalchuapa, El Salvador on April 2. 1885, Reyna Barrios increased his political activity under the government of Manuel Lisandro Barillas, who was jealous of his popularity and sent him to Europe under false pretenses that there was a diplomatic appointment for him. The appointment never materialized and Reina Barrios was stuck in Europe and then in the United States for a few years.

1892 Presidential elections 

Reyna Barrios finally made it back to Guatemala, in time to run for office in the 1892 presidential elections. It was the first election in Guatemala that allowed the candidates to advertise in the local newspapers. The candidates who ran for office were:

Barillas Bercian was unique among all liberal presidents of Guatemala between 1871 and 1944: he handed over power to his successor peacefully. When election time approached, he sent for the three Liberal candidates to ask them what their government plan would be. The following anecdote recounts better what happened then:

First arrived lawyer Francisco Lainfiesta, and General Barillas, with the friendliest of smiles, said: "Mr. Lainfiesta: you are one of the candidates in the upcoming elections and perhaps the more likely to win. Therefore, I would like to know what your attitude and your political system of government will be, if you get to win. Especially, I would like to know your attitude about my person; because I have made my mistakes, I do not deny it. I was a simple worker at my carpentry when General Justo Rufino Barrios sent for me to be appointed second presidential designate. I would therefore, Mr. Lainfiesta, know what conduct you will observe towards me." Mr. Lainfiesta said: "General Barillas: if luck would favor me with the election victory, my government will be based on strict adherence to the Constitution; the law would be the law and anyone who has acquired some responsibility, will have to answer for it before the relevant courts. A firm and righteous compliance with the constitutional provisions shall be the standard of my conduct as president". "Very well" said general Barillas, and both parted cordially.

Barillas then brought in Dr. Montúfar and interrogated him in the same or similar way as he had done Mr. Lainfiesta. Dr. Montúfar responded in similar terms as Lainfiesta, stressing his claims to obedience of the Constitution and strict enforcement.

Finally general Reyna Barrios came in; when in the midst of pleasant conversation, General Barillas repeated his question, and Reyna replied, with a sincere smile: "We should not even talk about that, general; because you and I are the same. Rest assured that I will know how to respect and protect you." And then both shook hands with effusion. By the election period, the first two days of voting favored Lainfiesta. But by the third day, a huge column of Quetzaltenango and Totonicapán Indigenous people came down from the mountains to vote for general Reyna Barrios. The official agents did their job: Reyna was elected president and, not to offend the losing candidates, Barillas gave them checks to cover the costs of their presidential campaigns. Reyna Barrios, of course, received nothing, but he went on to become President on March 15, 1892.

Government 

During Barrrios's first term in office, the power of the landowners over the rural peasantry increased. He oversaw the rebuilding of parts of Guatemala City on a grander scale, with wide, Parisian style avenues built. He oversaw Guatemala hosting the first "Exposición Centroamericana" ("Central American Fair") in 1897. During his second term, Barrios printed bonds to fund his ambitious plans, fuelling monetary inflation and the rise of popular opposition to his regime.

Infrastructure 

As part of the efforts for the Central American Expo, his government embellished the city with avenues and monuments following Parisian style and built the Northern Railroad of Guatemala. Due to the 1917-1918 earthquakes most of these structures were lost.

His administration also work on improving the roads, installing national and international telegraphs and introducing electricity to Guatemala City. Completing a transoceanic railway was a main objective of his government, with a goal to attract international investors at a time when the Panama Canal was not built yet.

Death 

José María Reina was assassinated on 8 February 1898 in Guatemala City, by Edgar Zollinger, a British citizen and administrator of the Aparicio Family business. Zollinger took revenge since back on September 13 1897 Reina Barrios had Juan Aparicio killed in an unlawful manner. Aparicio was the former Mayor of Quetzaltenango. His assets included the Zunil Electrical Plant, The Los Altos Railroad, Coffee Plantations and Local Bank. These businesses where appropriated illegally, leaving the Aparicio family in ruins for decades. The population mourned the death of Aparicio as he was loved for helping and aiding others. Reina Barrios lived his last moments as a criminal. His actions caused irreversible damage to Guatemalan infrastructure.

See also
 
 
 
 Exposición Centroamericana
History of Guatemala
 Northern Railroad of Guatemala
Manuel Estrada Cabrera

Notes and references

Notes

References

Bibliography

External links 
 

Presidents of Guatemala
Assassinated Guatemalan politicians
Assassinated heads of state
1854 births
1898 deaths
People from San Marcos Department
People murdered in Guatemala
Assassinated heads of government
Liberal Party (Guatemala) politicians
19th-century Guatemalan people
Manuel Estrada Cabrera